Oranoaken Creek is a  tributary of Delaware Bay in southern New Jersey in the United States.

See also
List of rivers of New Jersey

References

Rivers of New Jersey
Tributaries of Delaware Bay